Joachim Hartvig Johan von Barner (1699–1768) was a Danish-German military officer and government official. He served as the County Governor of several counties in Norway and Denmark.

Barner was born in Mecklenburg which was part of the Holy Roman Empire, but moved to Denmark in his youth. He started out as a military officer, serving in the Danish military until 1746. In 1746, he was appointed as the Diocesan Governor of Christianssand stiftamt (and simultaneously serving as the County Governor of Nedenæs amt). He was then transferred to Denmark where he served as the County Governor of Kalundborg, Dragsholm, Sæbygaard and Holbaek counties. He held that post until he died in 1768.

References

1699 births
1768 deaths
County governors of Norway